Brewsterdale is an unincorporated community in McDowell County, in the U.S. state of West Virginia.

History
A post office called Brewsterdale was established in 1915, and remained in operation until 1932. The community's name honors the Brewster family of settlers.

References

Unincorporated communities in McDowell County, West Virginia
Unincorporated communities in West Virginia